They Asked for It is a 1939 American crime film directed by Frank McDonald and written by Arthur T. Horman. The film stars William Lundigan, Joy Hodges, Michael Whalen, Isabel Jewell, Lyle Talbot, Thomas Beck and Spencer Charters. The film was released on May 20, 1939, by Universal Pictures.

Plot

Cast        
William Lundigan as Steve Lewis
Joy Hodges as Mary Lou Carroll
Michael Whalen as Howard Adams
Isabel Jewell as Molly Herkimer
Lyle Talbot as Marty Collins
Thomas Beck as Dr. Peter Sparks
Spencer Charters as Chief Lawson
James Bush as Tucker Tyler
Charles Halton as Dr. Tyler
Edward McWade as 'Pi' Kelly

References

External links
 

1939 films
1930s English-language films
American crime films
1939 crime films
Universal Pictures films
Films directed by Frank McDonald
American black-and-white films
1930s American films